Football 5-a-side was contested at the 2011 Parapan American Games from November 15 to 20 at the Pan American Hockey Stadium in Guadalajara, Mexico.

Medal summary

Medal table

Medal events

Results

Preliminary round

Finals

Fifth place match

Bronze medal match

Gold medal match

External links
2011 Parapan American Games – Football 5-a-side

football
2010
2011–12 in Mexican football
2011–12 in Argentine football
2011–12 in Uruguayan football
2011–12 in Salvadoran football
2011 in Colombian football
2011 in Brazilian football